Pazinotus stimpsonii is a species of sea snail, a marine gastropod mollusc in the family Muricidae, the murex snails or rock snails.

Description

Distribution
This deepwater marine species occurs off Guadeloupe.
Also from the Gulf of Mexico, east coast of Florida, 
and into the Caribbean Sea, south to Barbados.

References

G arrigues B . & Lamy D. 2018, 218. Muricidae récoltés au cours de la campagne KARUBENTHOS 2 du MNHN dans les eaux profondes de Guadeloupe (Antilles Françaises) et description de trois nouvelles espèces des genres Pagodula et Pygmaepterys (Mollusca, Gastropoda). Xenophora Taxonomy 20: 34-52
 Costa P.M.S. & Pimenta A.D. (2012) Revision of the genus Pazinotus (Gastropoda, Muricidae) from Brazil. American Malacological Bulletin 30(1): 117-126
 Rosenberg, G.; Moretzsohn, F.; García, E. F. (2009). Gastropoda (Mollusca) of the Gulf of Mexico, Pp. 579–699 in: Felder, D.L. and D.K. Camp (eds.), Gulf of Mexico–Origins, Waters, and Biota. Texas A&M Press, College Station, Texas.

Muricidae
Gastropods described in 1889